La Femme Anjola is a 2021 film written by Tunde Babalola and directed by Mildred Okwo. It is a  film noir psychological thriller which stars Rita Dominic and Nonso Bassey. It was released in cinemas on March 19, 2021.

Synopsis 
La Femme Anjola revolves around a stockbroker who fell in love with a mysterious woman. Anjola is married to a gangster who owns a nightclub where she does live performances.

Cast 

 Rita Dominic
 Nonso Bassey
 Joke Silva
 Femi Jacobs
 Aderounmu Adejumoke
 Bassey Ekpeyong
 Uzor Osimkpa
 Paul Adams
 Shawn Faqua
 Michelle Dede
 Mumbi Maina
 Soso Soberekon

Production and release 
The trio of Mildred Okwo, Tunde Babalola and Rita Dominic reunited for this production since the release of their 2012 film, The Meeting.

The film was reported to be removed from Film House Cinemas across Nigeria to make way for the movie Prophetess. Speaking in an interview with The Cable newspapers, director Okwo blamed the action on monopoly in the Nigerian film industry. She mentioned that the same cinema company had removed her 2015 film Surulere, under controversial circumstances. Public reactions following the removal affirmed Okwo's take, and she mentioned that she is planning to go digital via her company's online platforms and streaming services.

Awards and nominations

References

External links
 

2021 films
2021 psychological thriller films
2020s English-language films
English-language Nigerian films
Nigerian thriller films